Gilles Ségal (13 January 1929 – 11 June 2014) was a French actor, mime, and playwright. He performed on stage with Marcel Marceau, and in more than sixty films since 1954. He was born in Fălticeni, Romania. Among his most notable roles is that of one of the heist participants in Jules Dassin's Topkapi.

Filmography

References

External links 
 

1929 births
2014 deaths
French male film actors
French male television actors
People from Fălticeni